Pillow talk is intimate conversation between lovers which typically takes place in bed.

Pillow talk or Pillowtalk may also refer to:

Film and television
 Pillow Talk (film), a 1959 film directed by Michael Gordon
 Pillow Talk (Canadian TV series), a 2022 sketch comedy program
 Pillow Talk (Singaporean TV series), a 2012 Chinese-language drama
 Pillow Talks, a 2009 comedy web series
 "Pillow Talk" (Blue Heelers), a 2004 TV episode
 "Pillow Talk" (The Green Green Grass), a 2005 TV episode

Literature
 Pillow Talk, a novelization of the 1959 film by Marvin Albert
 Pillow Talk, a 2007 novel by Freya North
 Pillow Talk, a 1997 novel by Kristine Rolofson

Music

Albums
 Pillow Talk (Miki Howard album), 2006
 Pillow Talk, by Pieces of a Dream, 2006
 Pillow Talk, by Sylvia Robinson, or the title song (see below), 1973

Songs
 "Pillow Talk" (song), by Sylvia Robinson, 1973
 "Pillow Talk", by Doris Day from the film Pillow Talk, 1959
 "Pillowtalk" (song), by Zayn, 2016
 "Pillowtalk", by Isolée from We Are Monster, 2005

See also
 Pillow Talk 101, a 2006 EP by Faster Faster
 "Pillow Talkin'", a 2019 song by Tyler Joe Miller
 "Pillow Talking", a song by Lil Dicky from Professional Rapper, 2015